is a Japanese actor, voice actor and singer.

Biography 
He voiced Yuma Tsukumo in the anime series Yu-Gi-Oh! Zexal, Ushio in Ushio and Tora, Ikoma in Kabaneri of the Iron Fortress, Gō Nagakura in Battery, and Fudō Nomura in Armed Girl's Machiavellism. He was listed among the Best Voice Actors for Newtype Anime Awards in 2016.

He is also the official Japanese voice-dubbing artist for Edmund Pevensie in The Chronicles of Narnia, which was his debut role as a voice actor. Since 2013, Hatanaka has been employed by Ken Production.

His music career includes "Dying Wish", used as the opening theme in Moriarty the Patriot, and "Twisted Hearts", used as the opening theme for the anime's second season. In addition to his solo musical career, Tasuku is also a member of Animate Channel's group 8P (or eight piece).

On December 29, 2019, the agency I'm Enterprise announced in a statement that Hatanaka (at Ken Production) and Sayaka Senbongi, have gotten married.

Filmography

Anime

Film

Video games

Tokusatsu

Drama CDs

Dubbing roles

References

External links
Official agency profile 

1994 births
Living people
Japanese male child actors
Japanese male film actors
Japanese male pop singers
Japanese male video game actors
Japanese male voice actors
Lantis (company) artists
Male voice actors from Kanagawa Prefecture
People from Sagamihara
21st-century Japanese male actors
21st-century Japanese singers
21st-century Japanese male singers
Ken Production voice actors